North Cobb High School is a public high school located north of Atlanta in Kennesaw, Georgia, United States. It serves approximately 2900 students in the Cobb County School District, with classes from grades 9 to 12.  The school mascot is the warrior and the school colors are navy blue and orange. North Cobb is the second largest school in the district.

North Cobb was established in 1958, replacing Acworth High School, and is one of the oldest high schools in Cobb County. North Cobb has a magnet program designated for international studies.

In 2016, North Cobb was named an International Skills Diploma School by the Georgia Department of Education. An on-campus preschool provides field experience for students interested in pursuing early childhood education. North Cobb offers Advanced Placement programs such as AP Human Geography, AP Language, AP United States History, AP Chemistry, AP Biology, AP European History, AP Seminar, AP World History, AP United States Government and AP Environmental Science.

Demographics
The demographic breakdown of the 2,634 students enrolled for the school year 2012–2013 was:

Gender
Male – 50.5%
Female – 49.5%

Ethnicity 
Native American/Alaskan – 0.3%
Asian/Pacific Islander – 4.8%
Black – 34.4%
Hispanic – 14.4%
White – 42.7%
Multiracial – 3.4%

Activities

NJROTC
North Cobb High School hosts a Naval JROTC unit. This is actually a joint unit made up of cadets from both North Cobb and Harrison high schools; its official name is the North Cobb/Harrison NJROTC unit.

Notable alumni

 Donatello Brown – professional football player
 Harry Ford – professional baseball player
 Ron Lester – actor
 Ayman Mohyeldin – journalist; among Times 100 Most Influential People 2011
 Lee Moore – professional basketball player
 Larry Nelson – professional golfer, winner of multiple national and international tournaments
 Eric Norwood – Consensus All-American linebacker at the University of South Carolina, drafted in the NFL by the Carolina Panthers (2010 NFL Draft)
 Sean O'Pry – supermodel
 Robert Lee Ross, Jr. – United States Army Ranger and professional wrestler
 Darren Waller – professional football player for the New York Giants
 Travis Hawkins – National football league scout Baltimore Ravens
 Chandler Wooten - professional football player for the Carolina Panthers

References

External links
 
 North Cobb School of International Studies
 Cobb County School District

Schools in Cobb County, Georgia
Public high schools in Georgia (U.S. state)
Educational institutions established in 1957
Magnet schools in Georgia (U.S. state)
1957 establishments in Georgia (U.S. state)